Keya Kola (also Romanized as Keyā Kolā) is a village in Zanus Rastaq Rural District, Kojur District, Nowshahr County, Mazandaran Province, Iran. At the 2006 census, its population was 65, in 22 families.

References 

Populated places in Nowshahr County